Eight Bells is a 1935 American adventure film directed by Roy William Neill and starring Ann Sothern, Ralph Bellamy and Catherine Doucet. Produced by Columbia Pictures, it is based on the 1933 play  Eight Bells by Percy G. Mandley.

Plot
The owner of a line of steamships sends his prospective son-in-law  Roy Dale to take a major cargo to Shanghai. Unbeknownst to him his daughter Marge smuggles herself aboard as a stowaway. Dale has experience only on passenger ships and when a hurricane hits he loses his nerve and wants to abandon ship. Marge sides with his first mate Steve Andrews and persuades the crew to stay aboard and keep the ship afloat.

Cast
 Ann Sothern as Marge Walker 
 Ralph Bellamy as Steve Andrews 
 John Buckler as Roy Dale 
 Catherine Doucet as Aunt Susan 
 Arthur Hohl as Williams 
 Charley Grapewin as Grayson 
 Franklin Pangborn as Finch 
 John Darrow as Carl 
 Emerson Treacy as Sparks 
 Addison Richards as Tracey 
 David Clyde as MacIntyre 
 Spencer Charters as Walker
 Lydia Knott as Sparks' Mother
 Keye Luke as Interpreter
 George Regas as Pedro
 Sidney Bracey as Gleason

References

Bibliography
 Goble, Alan. The Complete Index to Literary Sources in Film. Walter de Gruyter, 1999.

External links
 

1935 films
1935 adventure films
American adventure films
Films directed by Roy William Neill
Columbia Pictures films
Seafaring films
Films set in Shanghai
American films based on plays
1930s English-language films
1930s American films